Marzili may refer to:

 Marzili, Bern, a neighbourhood in Bern, Switzerland
 Mərzili, a village in Azerbaijan